The 2008 Peak Antifreeze & Motor Oil Indy 300 was the seventeenth round of the 2008 IndyCar Series season. It took place on September 7, 2008. It was the last points race of the year. It was held at Chicagoland Speedway in Joliet, Illinois. Dixon held on to win his second IndyCar championship.

Race 

Peak Antifreeze
Peak Antifreeze Indy 300
Peak Antifreeze Indy 300
Chicagoland Indy 300